The Meng-Yin or Mengyin Formation is a geological formation in Shandong, China, whose strata date back to the Berriasian and Valanginian stages of the Early Cretaceous.

Dinosaur remains are among the fossils that have been recovered from the formation. The type material for the titanosauriform dinosaur Euhelopus was excavated at this formation by Otto Zdansky in 1923, in green/yellow sandstone and green/yellow siltstone that were deposited during the Barremian or Aptian stages of the Cretaceous period, approximately 129 to 113 million years ago.

Both the genus and species of Mengyinaia mengyinensis were named after the formation.

Vertebrate paleofauna 
Indeterminate stegosaurid remains have been found in Shandong, China.

Other fossils 
 Mengyinaia mengyinensis
Fish

 Sinamia zdanskyi
 Tanichthys ningjiagouensis
 Lycoptera sp.

Reptiles

 Ordosemys leios
 Shantungosuchus chuhsienensis
 Sinemys lens
 Sinochelys applanata
 ?Dsungaripteridae indet.
 Stegosauria indet.

See also 
 List of dinosaur-bearing rock formations

References

Bibliography 
 
  
 
 
 

Geologic formations of China
Lower Cretaceous Series of Asia
Cretaceous China
Berriasian Stage
Valanginian Stage
Sandstone formations
Siltstone formations
Paleontology in Shandong